Sagittaria brevirostra, common name Midwestern arrowhead or shortbeak arrowhead, is an aquatic plant species native to North America. It is common in wet places in an area stretching from Michigan and Ohio south to Alabama and west to North Dakota, Colorado and northern New Mexico, plus isolated populations in Maryland, New Brunswick, Virginia, Saskatchewan and California (Marin County).

Sagittaria brevirostra grows in shallow water along the edges of ponds, swamps and waterways. It is a perennial herb up to 70 cm tall, with arrow-shaped leaves and white flowers.

References

External links
photo of herbarium specimen at Missouri Botanical Garden, lectotype of Sagittaria brevirostra, collected in Missouri in 1903
Kansas Native Plants, Short Beak Arrowhead (Sagittaria brevirostra)
Altervista, Sagittaria brevirostra
Califlora taxon report
Gardening Europe, Piantaggine d acqua Sagittaria brevirostra Mackenzie & Bush 

brevirostra
Freshwater plants
Flora of Canada
Flora of the Eastern United States
Flora of the North-Central United States
Flora of the South-Central United States
Plants described in 1905
Taxa named by Kenneth Kent Mackenzie
Flora without expected TNC conservation status